Mary Jane Engh (born January 26, 1933, McLeansboro, Illinois) is a science fiction author and Roman scholar.  In 2009, Engh was named Author emerita by the Science Fiction and Fantasy Writers of America. She is best known for her 1976 novel Arslan, about an invasion of the United States.

Bibliography

Science fiction and fantasy 
Arslan (a.k.a. A Wind from Bukhara), 1976
The House in the Snow, 1987 (illustrated by Leslie W. Bowman)
Wheel of the Winds, 1988
Rainbow Man, 1993

Non-fiction 
In the Name of Heaven: 3000 Years of Religious Persecution
Femina Habilis: A Biographical Dictionary of Active Women in the Ancient Roman World from Earliest Times to 527 CE, Co-authored with Kathryn E. Meyer

References

External links

Review of Arslan at Special Circumstances
Review of Rainbow Man by Jo Walton: "In the end it’s not sex but religion that gets Liss [the protagonist] into real trouble ... "

1933 births
Living people
20th-century American novelists
American science fiction writers
American women short story writers
American women novelists
Women science fiction and fantasy writers
20th-century American women writers
20th-century American short story writers
21st-century American women